Uncial 0232 (in the Gregory-Aland numbering), is a Greek uncial manuscript of the New Testament. The manuscript palaeographically has been assigned to the 5th or 6th century.

It contains a small parts of the Second Epistle of John (1-9), on 1 parchment leaf (10 cm by 9 cm). The text is written in one column per page, 20 lines per page.

The Greek text of this codex is a representative of the Alexandrian text-type. Aland placed it in Category II. 

Currently it is dated by the INTF to the 5th or 6th century.

Don Barker proposes a wider and earlier range of dates for Uncial 0232, along with Papyrus 39, Papyrus 88 and Uncial 0206; and states that all four could be dated as early as the late second century or as late as the end of the fourth century.

The manuscript was added to the list of the New Testament manuscripts by Kurt Aland in 1953.

The codex is housed at the Ashmolean Museum (P. Ant. 12), in Oxford.

See also 

 List of New Testament uncials
 Textual criticism

References

Further reading 

 Colin R. Roberts, "The Antinoopolis Papyri" I, (Egypt Exploration Society: London, 1950), pp. 24-26. 

Greek New Testament uncials
5th-century biblical manuscripts